Rafał Lasocki  (born 2 July 1975 in Ostrowiec Świętokrzyski) is a former Polish professional footballer.

Career
Lasocki has made three appearances for the Poland national football team, scoring one goal.

References

External links
 
 

1975 births
Living people
Polish footballers
Poland international footballers
KSZO Ostrowiec Świętokrzyski players
Lech Poznań players
Dyskobolia Grodzisk Wielkopolski players
Obra Kościan players
Zawisza Bydgoszcz players
Śląsk Wrocław players
Wisła Płock players
People from Ostrowiec Świętokrzyski
Sportspeople from Świętokrzyskie Voivodeship

Association football defenders